Pyar Ka Devta is a 1991 Indian Hindi-language  film directed by K. Bapayya. It stars Mithun Chakraborty, Madhuri Dixit, Roopa Ganguly, Moushumi Chatterjee, Raj Kiran, Bharat Bhushan, Nirupa Roy, Suresh Oberoi, Mangal Dhillon, Kader Khan and Shakti Kapoor.

Cast
 Mithun Chakraborty as Vijay Kumar	
 Madhuri Dixit as Radha
 Roopa Ganguly as Shardha Kumar
 Bharat Bhushan  as Doctor
 Nirupa Roy as Parvati Kumar
 Moushumi Chatterjee as Chief Justice Saraswati Manohar Rai
 Raj Kiran as Advocate Gopal
 Aruna Irani as Prem Pyari
 Asrani as Dhakare
 Kader Khan as Pritam
 Shakti Kapoor as Dilip
 Aparajita Bhushan as Laxmi
 Mangal Dhillon as Murli M. Rai
 Shraddha Verma as Sangeeta Kumar
 Kishori Shahane as Sujata Kumar
 Suresh Oberoi as Inspector Arun
 Yunus Parvez as Potential in law of Vijay

Music

References

External links
 

1991 films
1990s Hindi-language films
Films directed by K. Bapayya
Films scored by Laxmikant–Pyarelal